is a Japanese professional mixed martial artist that has fought for Shooto, DEEP, World Victory Road, Pancrase and the UFC.

Mixed martial arts
Sasaki has primarily competed in the Shooto and Pancrase organizations, and holds notable wins over veterans Paul Taylor, Yuya Shirai, Keiichiro Yamamiya, Ryuta Sakurai, Jason DeLucia and Yuki Kondo. Though his background is in karate, Sasaki has relied on his jiu-jitsu skills, as most of his wins have been via armbar or triangle.

Championships and accomplishments
Sengoku
2008 Sengoku Middleweight Grand Prix Semifinalist

Mixed martial arts record

|-
| Loss
| align=center| 25–22–2
| Glenn Sparv
| TKO
| AFC 18: Australian Fighting Championship 18
| 
| align=center| 1
| align=center| N/A
| Tokyo, Japan
|
|-
| Loss
| align=center| 25–21–2
| Tahar Hadbi
| Decision (unanimous)
| AOW: Art of War 18
| 
| align=center| 2
| align=center| 5:00
| Tokyo, Japan
|
|-
| Win
| align=center| 25–20–2
| Hidenobu Koike
| Submission (rear naked choke)
| DEEP: Cage Impact 2015
| 
| align=center| 1
| align=center| 4:40
| Tokyo, Japan
|
|-
| Win
| align=center| 24–20–2
| Ryul Kim
| Decision (unanimous)
| Grabaka Live! 3
| 
| align=center| 3
| align=center| 5:00
| Tokyo, Japan
|
|-
| Draw
| align=center| 23–20–2
| Hiromitsu Kanehara
| Draw (unanimous)
| Grabaka Live! 2
| 
| align=center| 3
| align=center| 5:00
| Tokyo, Japan
|
|-
| Loss
| align=center| 23–20–1
| Keita Nakamura
| Decision (unanimous)
| Shooto: 5th Round
| 
| align=center| 3
| align=center| 5:00
| Tokyo, Japan
| 
|-
| Win
| align=center| 23–19–1
| Hidetaka Monma
| Decision (unanimous)
| Grabaka Live: 1st Cage Attack
| 
| align=center| 3
| align=center| 5:00
| Tokyo, Japan
| Welterweight debut.
|-
| Loss
| align=center| 22–19–1
| Mamed Khalidov
| TKO (punches)
| World Victory Road Presents: Soul of Fight
| 
| align=center| 1
| align=center| 2:22
| Tokyo, Japan
| 
|-
| Loss
| align=center| 22–18–1
| Paulo Filho
| Decision (unanimous)
| Bitetti Combat 8: 100 Years of Corinthians
| 
| align=center| 3
| align=center| 5:00
| São Paulo, Brazil
| 
|-
| Loss
| align=center| 22–17–1
| Xavier Lucas
| KO (punch)
| XMMA: Xtreme MMA 3
| 
| align=center| 5
| align=center| N/A
| Sydney, New South Wales, Australia
| 
|-
| Loss
| align=center| 22–16–1
| Sean Salmon
| Decision (unanimous)
| FF 26: Fight Festival 26
| 
| align=center| 1
| align=center| 1:46
| Helsinki, Finland
| 
|-
| Loss
| align=center| 22–15–1
| Kazuhiro Nakamura
| Decision (unanimous)
| World Victory Road Presents: Sengoku 6
| 
| align=center| 1
| align=center| 1:46
| Saitama, Saitama, Japan
| 2008 Sengoku Middleweight Grand Prix Semifinals.
|-
| Win
| align=center| 22–14–1
| Yuki Kondo
| Submission (rear-naked choke)
| World Victory Road Presents: Sengoku 5
| 
| align=center| 2
| align=center| 1:08
| Tokyo, Japan
| 2008 Sengoku Middleweight Grand Prix First Round.
|-
| Loss
| align=center| 21–14–1
| Jorge Santiago
| Submission (armbar)
| World Victory Road Presents: Sengoku 2
| 
| align=center| 3
| align=center| 2:10
| Tokyo, Japan
| 
|-
| Win
| align=center| 21–13–1
| Bo Guk So
| Submission (armbar)
| DEEP: Glove
| 
| align=center| 1
| align=center| 1:46
| Tokyo, Japan
| 
|-
| Loss
| align=center| 20–13–1
| Dean Lister
| Decision (unanimous)
| UFC Fight Night 6
| 
| align=center| 3
| align=center| 5:00
| Las Vegas, Nevada, United States
| 
|-
| Win
| align=center| 20–12–1
| Paul Taylor
| Submission (armbar)
| P & G: Pain and Glory 2006
| 
| align=center| 1
| align=center| N/A
| Birmingham, England
| 
|-
| Loss
| align=center| 19–12–1
| Leonardo Lucio Nascimento
| Submission (anaconda choke)
| WCFC: No Guts No Glory
| 
| align=center| 1
| align=center| 2:23
| Manchester, England
| 
|-
| Win
| align=center| 19–11–1
| Rodney Glunder
| Submission (armbar)
| WCFC: No Guts No Glory
| 
| align=center| 1
| align=center| 4:40
| Manchester, England
| 
|-
| Win
| align=center| 18–11–1
| Takanori Kuno
| TKO (punches)
| DEEP: 22 Impact
| 
| align=center| 1
| align=center| 2:20
| Tokyo, Japan
| 
|-
| Loss
| align=center| 17–11–1
| Gustavo Machado
| Decision (majority)
| Pancrase: Spiral 2
| 
| align=center| 3
| align=center| 5:00
| Yokohama, Kanagawa, Japan
| 
|-
| Win
| align=center| 17–10–1
| Yuya Shirai
| Decision (unanimous)
| Pancrase: Brave 11
| 
| align=center| 3
| align=center| 5:00
| Tokyo, Japan
| 
|-
| Win
| align=center| 16–10–1
| Buck Meredith
| Submission (triangle choke)
| Pancrase: Brave 8
| 
| align=center| 2
| align=center| 3:13
| Tokyo, Japan
| 
|-
| Loss
| align=center| 15–10–1
| Fabio Leopoldo
| Decision (majority)
| Pancrase: 2004 Neo-Blood Tournament Semifinals
| 
| align=center| 3
| align=center| 5:00
| Tokyo, Japan
| 
|-
| Win
| align=center| 15–9–1
| Yukiya Naito
| Decision (unanimous)
| Pancrase: Brave 5
| 
| align=center| 3
| align=center| 5:00
| Tokyo, Japan
| 
|-
| Loss
| align=center| 14–9–1
| David Terrell
| KO (punch)
| Pancrase: Hybrid 11
| 
| align=center| 2
| align=center| 0:15
| Tokyo, Japan
| 
|-
| Win
| align=center| 14–8–1
| Heath Sims
| Decision (unanimous)
| Pancrase: Spirit 5
| 
| align=center| 3
| align=center| 5:00
| Tokyo, Japan
| 
|-
| Loss
| align=center| 13–8–1
| Daisuke Watanabe
| KO (punch)
| Pancrase: Hybrid 7
| 
| align=center| 1
| align=center| 4:18
| Tokyo, Japan
| 
|-
| Loss
| align=center| 13–7–1
| Ricardo Almeida
| Decision (unanimous)
| Pancrase: Hybrid 4
| 
| align=center| 3
| align=center| 5:00
| Tokyo, Japan
| 
|-
| Loss
| align=center| 13–6–1
| Rodrigo Gracie
| Decision (unanimous)
| PRIDE 24
| 
| align=center| 3
| align=center| 5:00
| Fukuoka Prefecture, Japan
| 
|-
| Loss
| align=center| 13–5–1
| Ikuhisa Minowa
| Decision (majority)
| Pancrase: Spirit 8
| 
| align=center| 3
| align=center| 5:00
| Yokohama, Kanagawa, Japan
| 
|-
| Win
| align=center| 13–4–1
| Alex Stiebling
| Decision (unanimous)
| Pancrase: 2002 Anniversary Show
| 
| align=center| 3
| align=center| 5:00
| Yokohama, Kanagawa, Japan
| 
|-
| Win
| align=center| 12–4–1
| John Glover
| Submission (armbar)
| Pancrase: Spirit 5
| 
| align=center| 2
| align=center| 1:19
| Tokyo, Japan
| 
|-
| Draw
| align=center| 11–4–1
| Gustavo Machado
| Draw
| DEEP: 4th Impact
| 
| align=center| 3
| align=center| 5:00
| Nagoya, Aichi, Japan
| 
|-
| Win
| align=center| 11–4
| Keiichiro Yamamiya
| Submission (armbar)
| Pancrase: Spirit 1
| 
| align=center| 1
| align=center| 4:29
| Tokyo, Japan
| 
|-
| Win
| align=center| 10–4
| Osami Shibuya
| Submission (triangle armbar)
| Pancrase: Proof 7
| 
| align=center| 3
| align=center| 3:42
| Yokohama, Kanagawa, Japan
| 
|-
| Win
| align=center| 9–4
| Daisuke Ishii
| Submission (armbar)
| Pancrase: Proof 6
| 
| align=center| 1
| align=center| 3:01
| Tokyo, Japan
| 
|-
| Win
| align=center| 8–4
| Jason DeLucia
| Submission (armbar)
| Pancrase: 2001 Neo-Blood Tournament Opening Round
| 
| align=center| 2
| align=center| 3:05
| Tokyo, Japan
| 
|-
| Loss
| align=center| 7–4
| Ikuhisa Minowa
| Submission (toe hold)
| Pancrase: Proof 3
| 
| align=center| 3
| align=center| 0:25
| Tokyo, Japan
| 
|-
| Win
| align=center| 7–3
| Daisuke Watanabe
| Submission (armbar)
| Pancrase: Proof 1
| 
| align=center| 1
| align=center| 4:12
| Tokyo, Japan
| 
|-
| Loss
| align=center| 6–3
| Martijn de Jong
| Submission (triangle choke)
| Shooto: R.E.A.D. 12
| 
| align=center| 1
| align=center| 0:40
| Tokyo, Japan
| 
|-
| Loss
| align=center| 6–2
| Masanori Suda
| Decision (unanimous)
| Shooto: R.E.A.D. 3
| 
| align=center| 3
| align=center| 5:00
| Osaka, Japan
| 
|-
| Win
| align=center| 6–1
| Ronald Jhun
| Submission (triangle/armbar)
| Shooto: R.E.A.D. 1
| 
| align=center| 3
| align=center| 2:20
| Tokyo, Japan
| 
|-
| Loss
| align=center| 5–1
| Larry Papadopoulos
| Decision (unanimous)
| Shooto: Renaxis 2
| 
| align=center| 3
| align=center| 5:00
| Tokyo, Japan
| 
|-
| Win
| align=center| 5–0
| Ryuta Sakurai
| Submission (heel hook)
| Shooto: Shooter's Passion
| 
| align=center| 1
| align=center| 2:00
| Tokyo, Japan
| 
|-
| Win
| align=center| 4–0
| Kazuhiro Kusayanagi
| TKO (punches)
| Shooto: Las Grandes Viajes 6
| 
| align=center| 1
| align=center| 0:46
| Tokyo, Japan
| 
|-
| Win
| align=center| 3–0
| Nobuhiro Tsurumaki
| Decision (unanimous)
| Shooto: Shooter's Dream
| 
| align=center| 2
| align=center| 5:00
| Tokyo, Japan
| 
|-
| Win
| align=center| 2–0
| Izuru Takeuchi
| Decision (unanimous)
| Shooto: Gig '98 2nd
| 
| align=center| 2
| align=center| 5:00
| Tokyo, Japan
| 
|-
| Win
| align=center| 1–0
| Yasushi Warita
| Submission (heel hook)
| Shooto: Gig '98 1st
| 
| align=center| 1
| align=center| 1:19
| Tokyo, Japan
|

See also
List of male mixed martial artists

References

External links

1976 births
Living people
Japanese male karateka
Japanese Muay Thai practitioners
Japanese practitioners of Brazilian jiu-jitsu
People awarded a black belt in Brazilian jiu-jitsu
Japanese male mixed martial artists
Mixed martial artists utilizing kūdō
Mixed martial artists utilizing Muay Thai
Mixed martial artists utilizing shootfighting
Mixed martial artists utilizing Brazilian jiu-jitsu
PFU BlueCats players
Ultimate Fighting Championship male fighters